Kahiko-Lua-Mea (better known simply as Kahiko) is a god in Hawaiian mythology, who was once a chief on the Earth and lived in Olalowaia. He is mentioned in the chant Kumulipo and in the Chant of Kūaliʻi.

Kahiko is also mentioned in The Legend of Waia. The legend is that there was a head figure that had the ability to speak. He gave power to Kahiko because Waia lacked to keep up with his responsibilities as a chief.

He was born c. 144 in the Ololo Genealogy.

Etymology 
Kahiko's name means "old" or "ancient".

Family 
Kahiko's parents are Welaahilaninui and his wife Owe. According to Abraham Fornander, Welaʻahilaninui was the first man. According to the ancient chant Kumulipo, Kahiko was a son of Chief Keali’iwahilani and his wife Lailai.

Kahiko married Kupulanakehao and had three sons:
Wākea
 Lihau-ula
 Makuʻu

His granddaughter was Hoʻohokukalani.

Notes 

144 births
Year of death unknown
Ancient Hawaiian royalty
Hawaiian gods
Legendary progenitors
Legendary Hawaiian people